There is currently no article named Karl Grossmann on Wikipedia.

 For the German serial killer (1863–1922) see the article Carl Großmann.
 For the Austro-Hungarian film pioneer (1864–1929), also known as Karl Grosman, see the article Karol Grossmann.
 For the American professor of journalism (contemporary), see the article Karl Grossman.